Limacella illinita, or overflowing slimy stem, is a mushroom in the genus Limacella, in the family Amanitaceae.

Description

 Cap : It has approximately 2–7 cm long radius. It is round becoming convex then wide or with a broad umbo, the margin hanging with slimy veil remnants. It is white or cream in color. It feels smooth and sticky or slimy.
 Gills : They are free, non-waxy, close, broad and white in color.
 Stem / Stipe : The 5–10 cm long stem tapers a bit towards the top. It is fleshy, soft and has a ring. White in color, it is also sticky and slimy.
 Spores : Spores are globose to broadly ellipsoid and smooth.
 Microscopic features : The spores measure 4.5–6.5 x 4–6 µm.
 Flesh : Flesh is slimy and sticky.
 Fruiting : These mushrooms flower in between August or July and October or November.

Distribution and habitat

L. illinita is widely distributed in North America and often found in Europe. These can habitat singly, scattered, or in groups in woods, swamps, fields, lawns, roadsides and sand dunes.

Bioactive compounds

A study in 2007 discovered four new bioactive compounds from basidiomycetes, isolated from fermentations of L. illinita: Illinitone A that exhibited weak phytotoxic and moderate nematicidal activities against Caenorhabditis elegans, Illinitone B that was moderately cytotoxic, Limacellone that exhibited weak cytotoxic and phytotoxic activities and muurolane sesquiterpene 4a that was found to be inactive in the assays performed there.

References

Fungi of North America
Amanitaceae
Fungi of Europe
Taxa named by Elias Magnus Fries